The 2009 Uzbekistan First League  was the 18th season of 2nd level football in Uzbekistan since 1992.

Teams and locations

Competition format

League consists of 14 teams which play on regular home-and-away schedule: each team plays the other teams twice. The top two teams of the promote to Uzbek top league.

League table
The final standings of teams after last matchday.

Top goalscorers

References

External links
pfl.uz: First league results
Soccerway.com; Standings, Fixtures & Results

Uzbekistan Pro League seasons
2
Uzbek
Uzbek